David Sean "Gleeso" Gleeson (born 3 June 1968) is the lead singer of Australian hard rock group The Screaming Jets. He was born in Newcastle, New South Wales and currently resides in Adelaide Hills, South Australia

Biography 
David Sean Gleeson, was born in 1968 and grew up in Newcastle. He made his stage debut in 1978, with his school choir at the Abermain Eisteddfod. At 11 years old he won $10 in a talent contest at Cardiff Worker's Club singing "Monster's Holiday" with a friend. Gleeson formed his first rock band, Aspect, in 1985, with school pal, Grant Walmsley.

In January 1989 Gleeson on lead vocals and Walmsley on guitar, were joined by Brad Heaney on drums, Richard Lara on guitar and Paul Woseen on bass guitar, to form The Screaming Jets as a hard rock band in Newcastle. Within twelve months they had performed more than 280 live shows, they established a reputation for being one of the best young live bands in Australia, winning the praises and support slots of The Angels, The Choirboys and The Radiators.

By late 1989, The Screaming Jets had won youth radio station Triple J's National Band Competition. They signed a recording deal with the leading independent label rooArt. The Screaming Jets moved from their hometown Newcastle to Sydney's notorious Kings Cross district in early 1990, and recorded their debut album All For One in mostly midnight to dawn sessions at a local studio, after playing live shows seven nights a week.

In 2006, Gleeson appeared as the vocal coach for actress Kate Fischer in the televised celebrity singing competition It Takes Two. He returned to the show in 2007 and partnered with TV presenter, Julia Zemiro.

In early 2011 Gleeson was offered a radio show with the Triple M network. By mid-year he was hosting two shows, Access All Areas and Rock of Ages, interviewing artists including Jimmy Barnes and Don McLean, and giving an inside view of the music industry. Late that year Gleeson recorded an album, Take It to the Streets (31 August 2012), with his childhood idols, The Angels, as their new lead singer, and they completed a national tour.

In 2014, he recorded a second album with them, called Talk The Talk

On 19 June 2016 at the Governor Hindmarsh - Adelaide, Dave Gleeson was inducted into The South Australian Music Hall Of Fame, alongside The Angels.

On 31 January 2022 he returned to Australian rock radio station Triple M filling the 7-10pm nightly slot with his new show Triple M nights with Dave Gleeson broadcasting across Australia from Triple M Adelaide studio.

References

External links 
 Access All Areas With Dave Gleeson
 The Screaming Jets - Official Web Site

1968 births
People from Newcastle, New South Wales
Australian rock singers
Living people
The Angels (Australian band) members
Songs written by Dave Gleeson